Lars Bock (born 2 January 1955) is a former Danish handball player who competed in the 1976 Summer Olympics.

He played his club handball with Olympia Helsingborg. In 1976 he was part of the Denmark men's national handball team which finished eighth in the Olympic tournament. He played all six matches and scored eight goals.

References

1955 births
Living people
Danish male handball players
Olympic handball players of Denmark
Handball players at the 1976 Summer Olympics